Bagada is a genus of moths of the family Noctuidae.

Species
 Bagada api Holloway, 1989
 Bagada cinnamomea (Roepke, 1938)
 Bagada fuscostrigata Bethune-Baker, 1906
 Bagada hilaris (Warren, 1912)
 Bagada labi Holloway, 1989
 Bagada lignigera (Walker, [1863])
 Bagada magna (Hampson, 1894)
 Bagada malayica (Snellen, [1886])
 Bagada ochracea (Warren, 1912)
 Bagada olivacea (Warren, 1912)
 Bagada ornata (Wileman & West, 1929)
 Bagada poliomera (Hampson, 1908)
 Bagada semirufa (Warren, 1912)
 Bagada spicea (Guenée, 1852)
 Bagada tricycla (Guenée, 1852)
 Bagada turpis (Warren, 1912)

References
 Bagada at Markku Savela's Lepidoptera and Some Other Life Forms
 Natural History Museum Lepidoptera genus database

Condicinae
Moth genera